Karl Bartholomaeus Heller  (20 November 1824 – 14 December 1880) was an Austrian botanist and naturalist who explored Mexico in 1845–48 and published his memoir. In the latter year Johann Jakob Heckel published the livebearing freshwater Green swordtail (Xiphophorus helleri), since the early 20th century a common aquarium fish, from specimens Heller deposited in Vienna. Born in Moravia, Heller was a professor at the Theresianum in Vienna. Among Heller's later works is his defense of Darwinism, Darwin und der Darwinismus,  1869.

Notes

1824 births
1880 deaths
Austrian biologists